Nokasad (full name Somdetch Brhat Chao Jaya Sri Samudra Buddhangkura; alternate names Soi Si Samout Phouthong Koun; King of Champa Nagapurisiri or Nakhon Champa Nakhaburisi) (reckoned posthumously to have been born in 1693 as Prince (Chao) Nakasatra Sungaya or Nokasat Song) was a grandson of the last king of Lan Xang, King Sourigna Vongsa; and a son-in-law of the Cambodian King Chey Chettha IV. He was made king of the southern Laotian Kingdom of Champasak from 1713 to 1737. In 1718, the first Lao muang in the Chi valley — and indeed anywhere in the interior of the Khorat Plateau — was founded at Suwannaphum District in present-day Roi Et Province by an official in the service of this king.  In 1725, he turned his executive powers over to his eldest son; he died at Khorat in 1738.

References

Kings of Champasak
18th-century monarchs in Asia
1738 deaths
18th-century Laotian people
17th-century Laotian people